Sultan Muhammad Shah ibni Almarhum Sultan Mansur Shah (1455–1475) was the founder of the old Pahang Sultanate who reigned from 1470 to 1475. A former heir apparent to the Melaka throne, he was banished by his father Mansur Shah for committing murder, following an incident in a Sepak Raga game and went into exile in Pahang, later installed as its first Sultan in 1470.

Personal life
Sultan Muhammad was known as Raja Muhammad before his accession, He was the second of the two sons of the sixth Sultan of Melaka, Mansur Shah by his wife Putri Wanang Sri Lela Wangsa, daughter of Dewa Sura, the last Pre-Melakan ruler of Pahang, who was also a relative of the King of Ligor. Both his mother and grandfather were captured and presented to the Sultan of Melaka after the conquest of Pahang in 1454.

Young Raja Muhammad was favoured greatly by his father, as he was named Raja Muda ('heir apparent') as the immediate successor to his father instead of his elder brother, Raja Ahmad. The prince however, had earned a reputation of being a hot-tempered youth. This ultimately brought about his own exile from Melaka after having murdered Tun Besar, a son of Bendahara, Tun Perak.

Sultan Muhammad was married to a Kelantanese princess named Mengindera Puteri, the granddaughter of Sultan Iskandar Shah of Kelantan (r. 1429–1467). From the marriage he had issued three sons; Raja Ahmad, Raja Abdul Jamil, and Raja Mahmud.

The Sepak Raga incident
One day, while riding his horse around the Bendahara neighbourhood with his retinue, Raja Muhammad passed a group of boys who were engaged in a sepak raga game. Tun Besar, the son of Tun Perak was among those who were playing. All of sudden, a misdirected sepak raga ball kicked by Tun Besar, hit directly the head of Raja Muhammad, knocking off his headdress. The infuriated prince immediately approached Tun Besar, drew his kris, and pierced it at a point from the back, which went straight into the heart, instantly killing the boy.

The nearby Bendahara's people witnessing the incident immediately went to arms and ready to avenge Tun Besar. Tun Perak intervened at the scene, and warned the mob to restrain from any act of treason against the Sultan, reminding them that Hamba Melayu tidak pernah derhaka ('Malay folks will never commit any act of treason'). At the same time, Tun Perak made a vow that he would never accept the rule of the murderer prince. After hearing about the incident and at the pressure of the Bendahara family, Sultan Mansur agreed that Raja Muhammad should be exiled from Melaka.
He recalled the governor of Pahang, Seri Bija Diraja Tun Hamzah, back to Melaka, to escort the young prince to Pahang. Raja Muhammad was stripped of his titles in Melaka to be sent away to Pahang to be its Sultan. This began the Melaka line of royalty on the Pahang throne.

Reign in Pahang
Raja Muhammad brought with him the trappings of the Melakan court to Pahang. He had with him Tun Hamzah, the former governor of Pahang as his first Bendahara, Seri Akar Raja as his chief Hulubalang, a Penghulu Bendahari ('chief treasurer'), a Temenggong and 100 boys and 100 girls of noble family. He was installed as Sultan Muhammad Shah in the year 1470.

The system of administration adopted by the sultanate is largely modelled on that Melaka. Pahang promulgated court traditions based on the Melakan system as enshrined in both Undang-Undang Melaka and Undang-Undang Laut Melaka, and enforced the existing adat and religious rules to maintain social order. All rules, prohibitions and customs that have been codified as laws, were in turn collected through oral traditions and memorised by senior ministers. Although Pahang was already a Sultanate, it retains its status as a vassal to Melaka, although the nature of the relationship tends to change in later years depending on who were in power.

The boundaries of Sultan Muhammad's realm stretched from Sedili Besar to the borders of Terengganu, which was back then ruled by a chieftain, also a vassal to Melaka. His royal court is said to have been established at Tanjung Langgar, Pekan, which was also thought to be the seat of rulers of the Old Pahang Kingdom.

Death
Sultan Muhammad died on 17 September 1475, possibly from poisoning based on the Portuguese records, and was buried at Langgar, Dusun Pinang, Pahang. He is styled as Marhum Langgar ('the late ruler who was buried at Langgar') thereafter, and succeeded by his elder brother, Raja Ahmad.

The tombstone at the grave of Sultan Muhammad, contain epitaph in Arabic detailing his descent and the date of his death. The inscriptions corroborates the account provided by the Malay Annals with regards to the genealogy of Melakan Sultans. The translation from Arabic as follows:

The inscribed date from the Islamic calendar, 16 Jumada al-awwal 880 AH, corresponds to 17 September 1475.

References

Bibliography

 
 
 
 
 
 

1455 births
1475 deaths
Sultans of Pahang
Child monarchs from Asia
15th-century monarchs in Asia
Deaths by poisoning
15th-century murdered monarchs
Founding monarchs